Uttam Leishangthem Singh (born 1985) is an Indian football player. He is currently playing for Air India FC in the I-League as a defender.

External links
 goal.com
 

Indian footballers
1985 births
Living people
I-League players
People from Imphal
Footballers from Manipur
Association football defenders
Air India FC players